The 2021–22 season is MŠK Žilina's 114th season in existence and the club's 25th consecutive season in the top flight of Slovak football. In addition to the domestic league, Žilina participated in this season's edition of the  Slovak Cup and the UEFA Europa Conference League.

Current squad 
As of 4 August 2021

For recent transfers, see List of Slovak football transfers summer 2021.

Out on loan

Reserve team

MŠK Žilina B are the reserve team of MŠK Žilina. They currently play in the second-level football league in Slovakia 2. Liga.

Squad
Head coach:  Vladimír Veselý 

Assistant coach:  Filip Kňazovič

Assistant coach:  Viktor Pečovský

Goalkeeper coach:  Dušan Molčan

As of 4 August 2021

Pre-season and friendlies

Competitions overview

Slovak First Football League

League table

Results by round

Matches

Slovak Cup

UEFA Europa Conference League

First qualifying round

Second qualifying round

Third qualifying round

Play-off round

Notes

References

External links 
Official website

MŠK Žilina seasons
Žilina
Žilina